Minsk Sports Palace is an indoor sports arena, located in Minsk, Belarus. The arena seats 4,842 spectators and opened in 1966. It hosts various indoor events, including HC Dynamo Minsk and the Kontinental Hockey League before Minsk-Arena was completed.

History

From the 1960s–1980s, the largest state events were held at the Sports Palace. Championships and international tournaments in wrestling, fencing, boxing, weightlifting, rhythmic and artistic gymnastics and other sports were also held there, including matches in the championship hockey club of the Union Dynamo and handball SKA. The Palace was also a venue of the largest concerts and the Communist Party meetings. In 1990, the Palace premises were leased to various exhibition and sporting events.

Buildings

Large arena
The main arena of the Palace of Sports is a universal sport and entertainment room with a hockey box sizes of 61×30 meters. The total capacity of the stands is 3,311 visitors (including the main grandstand - 3,074 seats, small podium - 237 seats) in the sport even version; when the arene is transformed to the concert version, 4,500 spectators can attend the event.

Small arena

In 1999, the indoor training arena was built behind the Sports Palace. The small Sports Palace arena is used mainly as a platform for hockey and figure skating training sessions.

Sporting events
1975 World Sambo Championships
1975 World Wrestling Championships
1986 FIBA World Championship for Women
2010 IIHF World U18 Championships
2015 AMF Futsal Men's World Cup
2019 European Judo Championships

Concerts

Nazareth - November 22, 1999
Deep Purple - November 5, 2000 and March 27, 2011
Motörhead - December 4, 2000
Natalia Oreiro - March 13, 2002
Scorpions - November 5, 2002 and November 7, 2008
Whitesnake - November 10, 2004
Accept - April 29, 2005 and March 7, 2011
Zemfira - October 1, 2005 and February 20, 2008
Ronnie James Dio - October 2, 2005
W.A.S.P. - November 8, 2006
Korol i Shut - April 22, 2007, April 20, 2009 and March 28, 2010
Toto Cutugno - November 17, 2007
Bryan Adams - December 2, 2007
Grigory Leps - February 25, 2008
Valery Meladze - March 23, 2008
Europe - March 28, 2008
Thomas Anders - April 18, 2008
Lyapis Trubetskoy - May 9, 2008 and March 9, 2009
Okean Elzy - May 29, 2008 and May 12, 2010
Tarja Turunen - November 4, 2008 and March 4, 2012
Vyacheslav Butusov - December 7, 2008 and May 27, 2010, with U-Piter
Over the Rainbow - February 14, 2009
OneRepublic - November 5, 2014
Sepultura - March 4, 2009
Jethro Tull - March 10, 2009

Smokie - March 28, 2009, December 10, 2010
Valery Kipelov - April 16, 2009, April 29, 2011
Enrique Iglesias - April 24, 2009
Alla Pugacheva - May 7, 2009
Alexander Rybak - September 28, 2009
MakSim - October 17, 2009 & March 2, 2011
Splean - October 25, 2009
Scooter - October 27, 2009
Chris Rea - February 14, 2010
Vanessa-Mae - June 20, 2010
F.R David - February 2, 2013
Limp Bizkit - October 5, 2010 and December 2, 2013
Garou - October 21, 2010
a-ha - November 6, 2010
Vladimir Kuzmin - November 15, 2010
Mumiy Troll - November 24, 2010
Within Temptation - October 26, 2015

References

External links

 
Venue information

Indoor arenas in Belarus
Indoor arenas built in the Soviet Union
Buildings and structures completed in 1966
Buildings and structures in Minsk
Ice hockey venues in Belarus
Kontinental Hockey League venues
Sports venues completed in 1966
HC Dinamo Minsk